Popular is a 2020 Iranian film written and directed by Soheil Beiraghi. The film screened for the first time at the 38th Fajr Film Festival.

Cast 

 Fatemeh Motamed-Arya as Fahime Mirbod
 Hootan Shakiba as Milad Bodaghi
 Baran Kosari as Afsane Shirkhodaei

Commentary and controversy 
In 2019, Popular, Beiraghi's third feature film was eliminated from the Fajr Festival's public screening program.  The director published a comment on his social media page which read: “God in Heaven!... Popular wasn’t allowed to be screened in Mashhad!  I called all the people I knew to ask why. All of them said unanimously, ‘We just obey orders from above!’ I wonder where and who this “above” is!  I wish I could talk to this “above”! He or she needs to explain why he doesn't allow the others to see the film while he himself hasn't still seen it and simply eliminated it...” To show respect for his viewers, Beiraghi shared a few minutes of the beginning of his film through live video.

References

External links 

 

Films directed by Soheil Beiraghi